Cooks Valley may refer to:
Cooks Valley, California
Cooks Valley, Wisconsin